Sunset in Naples (Italian: Quando tramonta il sole) is a 1955 Italian musical melodrama film directed by Guido Brignone and starring Carlo Giuffrè, Maria Fiore and Giacomo Rondinella.

The film's art direction was by Ottavio Scotti. It was shot in Eastmancolor.

Cast
 Carlo Giuffrè as Salvatore Gambardella  
 Maria Fiore as Carolina  
 Giacomo Rondinella as Peppino  
 Abbe Lane as Eugenia Fougère  
 Alberto Rabagliati as L'impresario milanese 
 Franco Caruso as Gennarino  
 Giovanni Filidoro 
 Marcella Ferri 
 Eduardo Passarelli 
 Nietta Zocchi 
 Leonardo Severini 
 Eugenio Maggi
 Nerio Bernardi 
 Mario Carotenuto as Ferdinando Bideri  
 Charles Vanel

References

Bibliography
 Emiliano Morreale. Così piangevano: il cinema melò nell'Italia degli anni Cinquanta. Donzelli Editore, 2011.

External links

1956 films
1950s musical drama films
Italian musical drama films
1950s Italian-language films
Films directed by Guido Brignone
1950s Italian films
Melodrama films